Podarkes and Podarces (masculine), Podarke and Podarce (femine),  meaning swift-footed, may refer to:

Greek Mythology
 Podarces, a hero in Homer's Iliad
 Podarkes, the original name of Priam, king of Troy; see 
 Podarkes, an epithet of Achilles
 Podarke, a harpy
 Podarke, one of the Danaïdes

Other
 13062 Podarkes, an asteroid which belong to the Jupiter trojan
 Podarces pylzowi, a species of lizard
 Aphanocrex podarces, an extinct flightless rail from Saint Helena
 Phintia podarce, a moth of the family Notodontidae
 Agriades podarce, a butterfly in the family Lycaenidae
 Podarke Ehlers, an annelid taxa
 Scalmicauda podarce, a moth in genus Scalmicauda

Greek mythological heroes